Kestros or Kaystros may refer to:

 Kestros (weapon), a type of sling used to throw darts
 Kestros River, an ancient name of the Aksu River in Turkey
 a god of said river
 Kestros (Cilicia), a town of ancient Cilicia, later in Isauria
 Kestros (Pamphylia), a town of ancient Pamphylia, later in Isauria